Bernard Joao da Rocha (16 May 1927 – 23 February 2010) was a founding member and the First National Chairman of the New Patriotic Party. He was also the first Ghanaian Director of the Ghana School of Law when it was opened in 1958.

Education
B. J. Da Rocha was born in Cape Coast, Ghana, where he had his secondary education at Adisadel College.

Career
He lectured at the Ghana School of Law for almost two decades before retiring in 1992 as the first Ghanaian Legal Director of Education. He also served as the General Secretary of the Progress Party led by Kofi Abrefa Busia.

Honor 
In 1993, the Ghana Bar Association honored da Rocha for his contribution to the legal profession.

Legacy
Mountcrest University College in Ghana has instituted a lecture and a chair in Law and Politics in Da Rocha's memory and honour in recognition to his contribution to the legal fraternity in Ghana.

References

1930 births
2010 deaths
New Patriotic Party politicians
20th-century Ghanaian lawyers
Academic staff of Ghana School of Law
People from Cape Coast